Ben Hope is a mountain in northern Scotland. It is the most northerly Munro, standing alone in the Flow Country (a region of bumpy, peat-covered moorland) south-east of Loch Hope in Sutherland. The mountain is a roughly triangular wedge, with a great crag on the west, with two lower shoulders to the south and northeast. Alpine flowers are abundant in season, although the ground is very rocky.

Ascent

The principal route to the summit starts in Strathmore, to the west of the mountain, where there is parking off a small road. The route lies along  the Allt-na-caillich burn which flows down through a gap in the west-facing crags. The route is steep, but well marked with occasional cairns and not exposed. There is little available scrambling.

Approach from the east is rare, as there is a wide expanse of heather-covered moorland with no roads in that direction. Approach from the north is not possible for walkers, as there is no path between the crags.

The view from the summit includes the Pentland Firth, Loch Eriboll and the nearby mountains of Arkle and Foinaven. The Orkney Islands are visible on a clear day.

Just south of the Allt-na-caillich burn on the Strathmore road is the Dùn Dornaigil Broch.

See also
Highlands of Scotland
Andy Nisbet

External links
 Computer generated summit panorama

References

Munros
Mountains and hills of the Northwest Highlands
Marilyns of Scotland
Mountains and hills of Highland (council area)
Sites of Special Scientific Interest in North West Sutherland